3 Monocerotis is a binary star system in the equatorial constellation of Monoceros, located approximately 780 light years away from the Sun based on parallax. It is visible to the naked eye as a faint, blue-white hued star with a combined apparent visual magnitude of 4.92. The system is moving further from the Earth with a heliocentric radial velocity of +39 km/s.

The magnitude 4.98 primary, designated component A, has a stellar classification of B5 III, matching an evolved blue giant star.

References

B-type giants
Binary stars
Monoceros (constellation)
BD-10 1349
Monocerotis, 03
040967
028574
2128